Eretmocera shoabensis is a moth of the family Scythrididae. It was described by Hans Rebel in 1907. It is found in Yemen (Socotra).

The larvae have been recorded feeding on Statice species.

References

shoabensis
Moths described in 1907
Endemic fauna of Socotra